Heinrich Höfler (February 16, 1897 – October 21, 1963) was a German politician of the Christian Democratic Union (CDU) and former member of the German Bundestag.

Life 
In 1949 Höfler had himself nominated as a CDU candidate for the Emmendingen constituency for the election to the first Bundestag. He was elected by an absolute majority and continued to belong to the German Bundestag in the following legislative periods until his death in 1963. He was able to defend the direct mandate in his constituency in all ballots.

Literature

References

1897 births
1963 deaths
Members of the Bundestag for Baden-Württemberg
Members of the Bundestag 1961–1965
Members of the Bundestag 1957–1961
Members of the Bundestag 1953–1957
Members of the Bundestag 1949–1953
Members of the Bundestag for the Christian Democratic Union of Germany